The 1948–49 season was Maccabi Tel Aviv's 43rd season since its establishment, in 1906, and first since the establishment of the State of Israel.

Due to the 1948 Arab–Israeli War, civil footballing activities didn't start until spring 1949, with cup matches beginning on 9 April 1949 and league matches on 28 May 1949. The club played its first match of the season on 8 January 1949, in a friendly against the Air Force XI.

Israeli League

After 16 July 1949, the IFA announced the beginning of the summer break, and league matches resume in September 1949.

League Table (top half) as of 16 July 1949:

Pld = Matches played; W = Matches won; D = Matches drawn; L = Matches lost; GF = Goals for; GA = Goals against; Pts = Points

State Cup

References

Maccabi Tel Aviv F.C. seasons
Season
Maccabi Tel Aviv